Folliot is a given name or surname. Notable people with the name include:

Hermine Isabelle Maria Gräfin Folliot de Crenneville (1883–1951), Austrian writer and translator
Louis Charles Folliot de Crenneville (1763–1840), joined the French royal navy in the 1770s
Franz Folliot de Crenneville (1815–1888), his son and Austrian feldzeugmeister and Oberstkämmerer of Emperor Franz Joseph
Philippe Folliot (born 1963), French politician, member of the National Assembly of France
Richard Rasleigh Folliot Scott, PC, (born 1934), India-born British judge
Gerard Folliot Vaughan (1923–2003), British psychiatrist and politician

See also
Folliott
Foliot (disambiguation)
Follett (disambiguation)
Follifoot
Pholiota